Omaima Aree Nelson (born c. 1968) is an Egyptian former model and nanny who was convicted of murdering her husband, Bill Nelson. She is serving a life sentence at California Institution for Women, as of 2020. Her case made international headlines due to allegations of bondage sex, decapitation, castration and cannibalism.

Marriage and murder

Omaima Aree Nelson was born and raised in Egypt, and immigrated to the United States in 1986. 

She met her husband William E. "Bill" Nelson, a 56-year-old pilot, in October 1991, when she was 23. Within days of meeting, the couple married, but Omaima would later claim that during the couple's month-long union, she suffered sexual abuse by her husband.

Omaima claimed that on 28 November 1991, Bill had sexually assaulted her in their Costa Mesa, California apartment. Following this, Omaima stabbed Bill with scissors, then began beating him with a clothes iron. 

After killing him, she began dismembering his body, and cooked his head and boiled his hands to remove his fingerprints. She then mixed up his body parts with leftover turkey and disposed of him in a garbage disposal. Neighbors claim they heard the disposal unit running for hours after the time of Bill's death. 

She reportedly castrated him in revenge for his alleged sexual assaults. She told her psychiatrist that she had cooked her husband's ribs in barbeque sauce and eaten them, but later denied this.

Trial and aftermath

Omaima was arrested on a suspicion of murder charge in December 2, 1991, and her trial began almost exactly one year later on December 1, 1992.  

During the trial it was revealed that as a child living in Cairo, she had undergone female genital mutilation and sex was traumatic and painful for her, only increased by the assaults she allegedly sustained during her marriage.  She was convicted of second-degree murder on January 12, 1993. She was sentenced to 27 years to life in prison.

Omaima first became eligible for parole in 2006, but was denied when "commissioners found her unpredictable and a serious threat to public safety." She became eligible again in 2011, but was denied by the parole board again, citing that she had not taken responsibility for the murder, and would not be a productive citizen if she were freed. She will not be able to seek parole again until 2026.

Omaima Nelson has been compared to fictional serial killer and cannibal Hannibal Lecter, from The Silence of the Lambs. Her case has been televised on the Investigation Discovery programs Happily Never After and Deadly Women,"Model Killers", as well as an episode of Snapped and recently her case was again put into limelight by a popular YouTuber Bailey Sarian on her weekly series Murder, Mystery and Makeup Monday.

References 

1991 murders in the United States
Living people
Egyptian emigrants to the United States
Egyptian female murderers
Egyptian people convicted of murder
American female murderers
American people convicted of murder
People convicted of murder by California
Prisoners sentenced to life imprisonment by California
Egyptian cannibals
American cannibals
Female cannibals
Mariticides
20th-century Egyptian women
20th-century American women
20th-century American criminals
Year of birth missing (living people)